Blaine Township, Nebraska may refer to the following places in Nebraska:

 Blaine Township, Adams County, Nebraska
 Blaine Township, Antelope County, Nebraska
 Blaine Township, Cuming County, Nebraska
 Blaine Township, Kearney County, Nebraska

See also
Blaine Township

Nebraska township disambiguation pages